Islandia is a village in the northern part of the Town of Islip in Suffolk County, on Long Island, in New York, United States. The population was 3,335 at the 2010 census.

History
Islandia incorporated itself as a village in April 1985 after CA Technologies established its world headquarters in Hauppauge and trying to capture the Hauppauge School District, in the area some people informally referred to as South Hauppauge. After more than three years of conducting local research, residents appeared in front of Islip's officials to take the first steps in incorporating Islandia on September 16, 1980. At the meeting, locals presented the Town of Islip was a petition signed by 432 Islandia Residents, which was over the 180 minimum required, and also presented the $1,000 (1980 USD) filing fee required. Many officials in the Town of Islip, including Town Supervisor Michael LoGrande, were less than thrilled with the proposal, and Islip soon sued the organizers of the prospective village in an attempt to prevent Islandia's incorporation. It wasn't until December 1984 that the Town of Islip dropped their opposition and asked residents in return for at least 200 residents to sign a letter to promise that the community would not exclude minorities from living within its borders. An incorporation vote was soon held, during which residents ultimately voted in favor of incorporating, and in April 1985, Islandia officially became an incorporated village. Its founding father was Warren Raymond.

When it incorporated, Islandia became the first new village on Long Island to incorporate in over 15 years (the last village incorporated prior to Islandia was Lake Grove in 1968).

The core of Islandia is a 500-home housing development built by Levitt & Sons circa 1963, which offered seven different model homes to choose from. The original Levitt home buyers were informed during pre-construction sales that their children should attend the Hauppauge Union Free School District, but instead it became part of the Central Islip Union Free School District. The Levitt development was assigned the Central Islip ZIP code 11722 and was considered part of Central Islip until the incorporation of Islandia in 1985.

In August 2016, the village board approved plans for a new casino to be opened at the Marriott hotel. These plans attracted opposition from some members of the community citing possible crime and traffic problems, while others supported the first new casino to be opened in Suffolk County. Marriott International sold the property to Delaware North for $40.41 million because Marriott has a corporate policy against gambling. On February 27, 2017, Jake's 58 casino opened with 250 video lottery terminals.

Geography

Honeysuckle Pond, in Suffolk County's Lakeland Park, lies within the confines of the Village and should therefore be included in its geographic makeup. In the latter half of 2016 and the majority of 2017, the pond was virtually nonexistent, reduced to a muddy puddle devoid of wildlife.

Islandia straddles the Long Island Expressway and is near the geographic center of Long Island. It has no central business district, although it is home to the Islandia Center, which has a Walmart and Dave & Buster's.

Demographics

As of the census of 2000, there were 3,057 people, 1,007 households, and 753 families residing in the village. The population density was 1,369.6 people per square mile (529.3/km2). There were 1,031 housing units at an average density of 461.9 per square mile (178.5/km2). The racial makeup of the village was 73.63% White, 12.30% African American, 0.13% Native American, 6.05% Asian, 0.03% Pacific Islander, 4.94% from other races, and 2.91% from two or more races. Hispanic or Latino of any race were 19.10% of the population.

There were 1,007 households, out of which 35.3% had children under the age of 18 living with them, 59.8% were married couples living together, 11.1% had a female householder with no husband present, and 25.2% were non-families. 18.8% of all households were made up of individuals, and 2.3% had someone living alone who was 65 years of age or older. The average household size was 3.04 and the average family size was 3.49.

In the village, the population was spread out, with 24.7% under the age of 18, 6.9% from 18 to 24, 36.3% from 25 to 44, 25.1% from 45 to 64, and 7.0% who were 65 years of age or older. The median age was 36 years. For every 100 females, there were 92.3 males. For every 100 females age 18 and over, there were 88.8 males.

The median income for a household in the village was $69,519, and the median income for a family was $69,615. Males had a median income of $46,083 versus $34,261 for females. The per capita income for the village was $25,682. About 4.0% of families and 5.5% of the population were below the poverty line, including 7.1% of those under age 18 and 11.3% of those age 65 or over.

As of 2000, Islandia had the highest percentage of Turkish residents in the United States, at 2.5% of the village's population.

Education
Islandia is served by three school districts: the Central Islip Union Free School District, the Connetquot Central School District, and the Hauppauge Union Free School District.

References

External links

 Official website

Islip (town), New York
Villages in New York (state)
Villages in Suffolk County, New York
1985 establishments in New York (state)